Chengbei is a town of Linshui County in eastern Sichuan province, China, located immediately north of the county seat. , it has one residential community (社区) and 27 villages under its administration.

See also 
 List of township-level divisions of Sichuan

References 

Towns in Sichuan
Linshui County